Indiantown or Indian Town can refer to the following places in the United States:

 Indiantown, Florida, a village
 Indian Town, Alger County, Michigan, an unincorporated community
 Indiantown, Menominee County, Michigan, an unincorporated community
 Robin Glen-Indiantown, Michigan, a census-designated place
 Indiantown, South Carolina, an unincorporated community
 Indiantown Township, Bureau County, Illinois